Peter Jay Sweeney  (December 31, 1863 – August 22, 1901) was a third baseman in Major League Baseball in the 19th century. His professional career stretched from 1879 through 1897, though only 1888–1890 were spent in the Major Leagues.

Sources
 

1863 births
1901 deaths
Major League Baseball third basemen
Washington Nationals (1886–1889) players
St. Louis Browns (AA) players
Louisville Colonels players
Philadelphia Athletics (AA) players
19th-century baseball players
San Francisco Knickerbockers players
San Francisco Reno players
San Francisco Haverlys players
Troy Trojans (minor league) players
St. Paul Apostles players
Oakland Colonels players
Rochester Hop Bitters players
San Francisco Metropolitans players
Stockton River Pirates players
Sacramento Senators players
Binghamton Bingoes players
Allentown Buffaloes players
Nashville Tigers players
Rochester Browns players
Scranton Coal Heavers players
Sunbury Pirates players